Classic Cameo is a compilation album released by the funk/R&B group Cameo in Europe in 2003.  The album appears to focus on the band's hits from the 1980s, instead of a more comprehensive introspective.

Track listing
 "Word Up!" – 4:20 - Blackmon/Jenkins
 "Single Life – 4:29 - Blackmon/Jenkins
 "Candy" – 4:25 - Blackmon/Jenkins
 "She's Strange" – 3:47 - Blackmon/Jenkins/Leftenant/Singleton
 "Attack Me With Your Love" – 4:33 - Blackmon/Kendrick
 "Back and Forth" – 3:53 - Blackmon/Jenkins/Kendrick/Leftenant
 "I Just Want to Be" – 3:44 - Blackmon/Johnson
 "Why Have I Lost You" – 5:15 - Blackmon
 "Sparkle" – 4:04 - Blackmon/Lockett
 "Keep It Hot" – 4:03 - Blackmon/Lockett
 "Freaky Dancin'" – 4:17 - Blackmon/Jenkins
 "She's Mine" – 4:34 - Blackmon/Leftenant/Leftenant/Matthews
 "Just Be Yourself" – 4:03 - Blackmon/Jenkins/Singleton
 "A Good-bye" – 4:24 - Blackmon/Leftenant
 "Shake Your Pants" – 6:18 - Blackmon
 "You Make Me Work" – 4:42 - Blackmon

References

Cameo (band) compilation albums
Classic Cameo
Mercury Records compilation albums